Monte Monega is a  mountain of the Ligurian Alps, in Italy.

Geography 
The mountain belongs to the province of Imperia, in Liguria. In the SOIUSA (International Standardized Mountain Subdivision of the Alps) it belongs to the Nodo del Monte Saccarello group and Costiera Monega-Carmo di Brocchi subgroup (SOIUSA code: I/A-1.II-A.1.b). Monte Monega is the tripoint where the valleys of Argentina, Giara di Rezzo and Arroscia meet. Also the territories of three comuni (Montegrosso Pian Latte, Rezzo and Molini di Triora) meet on the top of the mountain, which is marked by a Summit cross.

History 

The slopes of Monte Monega were deforested during past centuries in order to increase pasture land. The highest part of the mountain is still used as a grazing area for local cattle, and maintains a good amount of biodiversity.

Access to the summit 
The summit of Monte Monega can be easily reached on foot starting from Colle del Garezzo (NW) or from Passo della Teglia (SW). The mountain in winter is a well known snowshoes hike.

Conservation 
The eastern side of the mountain since 2007 is included in the Parco naturale regionale delle Alpi Liguri.

Maps 
 Italian official maps by Istituto Geografico Militare (IGM), 1:25.000 and 1:100.000 scale (also on line version)
 Carta dei sentieri e dei rifugi scale 1:50.000 nr. 15 Albenga, Alassio, Savona, Istituto Geografico Centrale - Turin 
 Carta dei sentieri e stradale scala 1:25.000 nr. 23 Sanremo Ventimiglia Bassa val Roia Val Nervia, Fraternali editore - Ciriè

References

One-thousanders of Italy
Mountains of Liguria
Mountains of the Ligurian Alps
Province of Imperia